Radio 1's Life Hacks is a programme and podcast on BBC Radio 1, presented by Vick Hope and Katie Thistleton. The show began in 2017, replacing The Surgery in the Sunday teatime slot.

Format
The programme includes discussion of health and social issues such as exam stress, sexual health, alcohol and drugs.

The original presenters were Cel Spellman, Katie Thistleton and Radha Modgil. In August 2020, Spellman was replaced by Vick Hope

References

External links
 

BBC Radio 1 programmes
2017 radio programme debuts